Juan Miguel López (born 7 April 1967) is a Cuban former track and field athlete who specialised in the triple jump.

He won bronze at the 1989 IAAF World Indoor Championships, silver at the 1989 Central American and Caribbean Championships and silver at the 1990 Central American and Caribbean Games.

He won a silver medal at the 1986 World Junior Championships in Athletics, but was subsequently disqualified for doping.

See also
List of doping cases in athletics

References

1967 births
Living people
Cuban male triple jumpers
Doping cases in athletics
Cuban sportspeople in doping cases
Central American and Caribbean Games silver medalists for Cuba
Competitors at the 1990 Central American and Caribbean Games
World Athletics Indoor Championships medalists
Central American and Caribbean Games medalists in athletics
20th-century Cuban people
21st-century Cuban people